The men's team sprint competition at the 2022 UEC European Track Championships was held on 11 and 12 August 2022.

Results

Qualifying
The eight fastest teams advanced to the first round.

First round
First round heats were held as follows:
Heat 1: 4th v 5th fastest
Heat 2: 3rd v 6th fastest
Heat 3: 2nd v 7th fastest
Heat 4: 1st v 8th fastest

The heat winners were ranked on time, from which the top 2 proceeded to the gold medal final and the other 2 proceeded to the bronze medal final.

Finals

References

Men's team sprint
European Track Championships – Men's team sprint